The 1983 British Grand Prix (formally the XXXVI Marlboro British Grand Prix) was a Formula One motor race held at Silverstone on 16 July 1983. It was the ninth race of the 1983 Formula One World Championship.

The 67-lap race was won by Alain Prost, driving a factory Renault, after he started from third position. Nelson Piquet finished second in a Brabham-BMW, with Patrick Tambay third in a Ferrari. The win, Prost's third of the season, enabled him to extend his lead in the Drivers' Championship to six points.

Qualifying

Qualifying report
The front row of the grid was filled by the Ferraris of René Arnoux and Patrick Tambay, Arnoux over 0.6 seconds ahead. Arnoux was the first driver ever to lap Silverstone in under 1:10. Drivers' Championship leader Alain Prost was third in his Renault, with Elio de Angelis in the Lotus alongside him on the second row. The two Brabhams made up the third row with Riccardo Patrese ahead of Nelson Piquet, while on the fourth row were Eddie Cheever in the second Renault and Manfred Winkelhock in the ATS. Completing the top ten were Andrea de Cesaris in the Alfa Romeo and Derek Warwick in the Toleman. Further down the grid, the Spirit team with its Honda turbo engine made an impressive debut as Stefan Johansson qualified 14th, ahead of both McLarens and just one place behind reigning World Champion Keke Rosberg in the Williams.

Qualifying classification

† — Time disallowed.

Race

Race report
At the start of the race, Tambay moved ahead of Arnoux, while de Angelis quickly retired with a turbo failure. Cheever's engine failed on lap 4, while Johansson dropped out on lap 6 with fuel system problems. When Patrese's turbo gave up on lap 10, Piquet moved up to fourth behind the Ferraris and Prost, with de Cesaris fifth and Winkelhock sixth. Prost overtook Arnoux on lap 14, followed by Piquet five laps later. Then, on lap 20, Prost passed Tambay for the lead, with Piquet moving into second on lap 31. In the later stages of the race, Winkelhock's engine failed and de Cesaris dropped behind teammate Mauro Baldi, while Nigel Mansell, who had qualified only 18th in the second Lotus, made a charge through the field, passing Arnoux for fourth on lap 48. At the chequered flag, Prost was 19 seconds ahead of Piquet with Tambay, Mansell, Arnoux and Niki Lauda completing the top six.

In the Drivers' Championship, Prost doubled his lead over Piquet to six points, with Tambay two points further back. Renault moved into the outright lead of the Constructors' Championship, three points ahead of Ferrari.

Race classification

Championship standings after the race

Drivers' Championship standings

Constructors' Championship standings

References

British Grand Prix
British Grand Prix
Grand Prix
British Grand Prix